The Virginia College Athletic Association (VCAA), also known as the Virginia Collegiate Athletic Association, was a short-lived intercollegiate athletic conference that existed from 1972 to 1975. As its name suggests, the league's members were located in the state of Virginia. The present-day Old Dominion Athletic Conference subsequently began play in 1976.

Champions
 1972 – Unknown
 1973 – Emory & Henry
 1974 – Unknown
 1975 – James Madison

See also
List of defunct college football conferences

References